Wilhelm Reinhard was a German First World War fighter ace credited with 20 confirmed aerial victories.

The victory list

Wilhelm Reinhard's victories are reported in chronological order, not the order or dates the victories were confirmed by headquarters.
Abbreviations were expanded by the editor creating this list.

Citations

Sources
 

Reinhard, Wilhelm
Aerial victories of Reinhard, Wilhelm